Anita Page (born Anita Evelyn Pomares; August 4, 1910 – September 6, 2008) was an American film actress who reached stardom in the final years of the silent film era.

She was referred to as "a blond, blue-eyed Latin" and "the girl with the most beautiful face in Hollywood" in the 1920s. She retired from acting in 1936, but made a come back in 1961, then she retired again. Page returned to acting 35 years later in 1996 and appeared in four films in the 2000s.

Early life 
Anita Evelyn Pomares was born on August 4, 1910, in Flushing, Queens, New York. Her parents were Marino Leo Pomares Jr., who was originally from Brooklyn, and Maude Evelyn (née Mullane) Pomares. She had one brother, Marino Pomares III, who later worked for her as a gym instructor, and her mother worked as her secretary and her father as her chauffeur. Page's paternal grandfather Marino Sr. was from Spain, and had worked as a consul in El Salvador. Her paternal grandmother Anna Muñoz was of Castilian Spanish and French descent.

Career

Silent films and early talkies 

Page entered films with the help of friend, actress Betty Bronson. A photo of Page was spotted by a man who handled Bronson's fan mail who was also interested in representing actors. With the encouragement of her mother, Page telephoned the man who arranged a meeting for her with a casting director at Paramount Studios. After doing a screen test for Paramount, she became among the first residents of the Chateau Marmont.  Page was offered contracts by both studios and selected MGM, "because they were so good for female actresses. If you ask me, MGM was the studio."

Page's first film for MGM was the 1928 comedy-drama Telling the World, opposite William Haines. Her performance in her second MGM film, Our Dancing Daughters (1928) opposite Joan Crawford was a success and it inspired two similar films in which they also co-starred, Our Modern Maidens and Our Blushing Brides. "I used to say that we're going to be 'The Galloping Grandmothers' at the rate we're going with these pictures," she reminisced in 1993.

The Broadway Melody (1929) is considered among her more successful films, and it won Best Picture at the Academy Awards. Page transitioned to sound films, but she criticised the total loss of silent films. "In my opinion, silents were much better than talkies. One thing you had was mood music, which you could have playing throughout your scene to inspire you. My favorite song was 'My Heart at Thy Sweet Voice' from Samson and Delilah. I never seemed to tire of it. The trouble with talkies was, they let you have the music, but they'd stop it when you had to talk, and it was always a let down for me."

When not working on films, she was busy with studio photographer George Hurrell creating publicity shots. She was one of his early subjects, and her photograph was his first to be published. MGM played up her heritage in these press releases such as this 1932 blurb: "She is that rarest and most interesting type of beauty,” ... “A Spanish blonde", and dubbed her "a blonde, blue-eyed Latin".

She was the leading lady to Lon Chaney, Buster Keaton, Robert Montgomery, Clark Gable and others. During the early 1930s, she was one of Hollywood's busier actresses. She was involved romantically with Gable briefly during that time. At the height of her popularity, she was receiving more fan mail than any other female star, with the exception of Greta Garbo, and received several marriage proposals from Benito Mussolini in the mail.

Retirement 
When her contract expired in 1933, she announced her retirement from acting at the age of 23. She retired as she was denied a pay rise. She made one more movie, Hitch Hike to Heaven, in 1936, and then retired fully from acting. Later, Page claimed that Irving Thalberg had offered her the starring role in three movies if she would sleep with him, which she refused.

She married composer Nacio Herb Brown in 1934. The marriage was annulled a year later because Brown's previous divorce had not been finalized at the time they were married. She married Navy pilot Lieutenant Hershel A. House on January 9, 1937 in Yuma, Arizona. They moved to Coronado, California and lived there until his death in 1991. They had two daughters, Linda and Sandra.

Return to acting 
Page came back to acting and portrayed a nun in The Runaway, completed in 1961, but she cut short her comeback. She returned to acting in 1996 after 35 years of retirement and appeared in several low-budget horror films. Film veteran Margaret O'Brien appeared in two of them.

Later years and death 
Page was the last living attendee of the first Academy Awards ceremony in 1929, and frequently gave interviews as the "last star of the silents", appearing in documentaries about the era.

Page died in her sleep at the age of 98 on September 6, 2008 at her home in Los Angeles home, where she had lived with long-time companion Randal Malone. She is buried in the Holy Cross Cemetery in San Diego.

Legacy 
For her contribution to the motion picture industry, Anita Page has a star on the Hollywood Walk of Fame at 6116 Hollywood Boulevard.

Personal life 
Page was a Democrat who supported the campaign of Adlai Stevenson during the 1952 presidential election. Page was a Catholic.

Anita's second marriage was to Herschel Austin House in 1937. They lived in southern California and were together for 54 years until Herschel's death in 1991 at the age of 84. Herschel had retired from the Navy as a rear admiral. They had two daughters, Sandra and Linda, and they are buried together under his last name.

Filmography

References 
Citations

Works cited

External links 

 
 Anita Page Biography and Gallery
 Anita Page Photo Gallery
 Anita Page at Golden Silents
 Guardian Interview with Anita Page
 Photographs of Anita Page
 Anita Page

1910 births
2008 deaths
20th-century American actresses
21st-century American actresses
Actresses from New York City
American child actresses
American film actresses
American people of French descent
American people of Spanish descent
American silent film actresses
Burials at Holy Cross Cemetery, Culver City
California Democrats
Catholics from California
Catholics from New York (state)
Hispanic and Latino American actresses
Metro-Goldwyn-Mayer contract players
New York (state) Democrats
People from Queens, New York
WAMPAS Baby Stars
Washington Irving High School (New York City) alumni